is a Japanese football player who currently plays for Kamatamare Sanuki.

Club career statistics
Updated to 23 February 2018.

References

External links
Profile at Oita Trinita
Profile at Nagoya Grampus

1983 births
Living people
Kokushikan University alumni
Association football people from Kanagawa Prefecture
Japanese footballers
J1 League players
J2 League players
J3 League players
Nagoya Grampus players
JEF United Chiba players
Oita Trinita players
Kamatamare Sanuki players
Association football defenders